Callionymus megastomus, the Indian megamouth dragonet, is a species of dragonet native to the Indian Ocean around India.

References 

M
Fish described in 1982